Big Soul Productions is a film and television production company based in Toronto, Ontario, Canada.  It is notable for being Aboriginal owned and operated.  Big Soul was established in August 1999 by Laura J. Milliken and Jennifer Podemski.

Programs 
From 2003 Big Soul produced Moccasin Flats, a dramatic series which subsequently was nominated for several Gemini Awards.

From 2001 to 2003, Big Soul Productions also produced three seasons of The Seventh Generation, a youth television series.

In 2000, Big Soul began a series of empowerment workshops titled repREZentin' to train Aboriginal youth in all areas of filmmaking.  Many of these projects resulted in completed half-hour films that were broadcast on APTN, including the "Moccasin Flats", a short film which was later adapted into the television series.

References

External links 
 BigSoul.net, official company website

First Nations mass media
Television production companies of Canada
Indigenous film and television production companies in Canada
Indigenous peoples in Toronto
Indigenous organizations in Ontario